Joseph Kasheku Musukuma (born February 12, 1974) is a Tanzanian politician and a member of the Chama Cha Mapinduzi political party. He was elected MP representing Geita in 2015.

References 

1974 births
Living people
Chama Cha Mapinduzi politicians
Tanzanian MPs 2015–2020
Tanzanian MPs 2020–2025